Woodland Mall is an enclosed super-regional shopping mall located in Kentwood, Michigan, a suburb of Grand Rapids. It formerly housed a movie theater which opened as Cinemark, was purchased by Celebration Cinema and subsequently closed in 2020. The mall is owned and managed by Pennsylvania Real Estate Investment Trust, who acquired it from its developer, Taubman Centers, in 2006.

History
Woodland Mall opened in 1968 at the northwestern corner of 28th Street (M-11) and East Beltline Avenue (M-37). The mall was built at a southwest-to-northeast orientation, with Sears at the southwestern end, and JCPenney at the northeastern end. A Kresge dime store was also located in the Sears wing. Another mall, Eastbrook Mall (now Centerpointe Mall), was located on the northeastern corner of the same intersection. A 1975 expansion to Woodland Mall brought a northwesterly-oriented central wing which ended in a third anchor store, Hudson's. After the closure of Kresge in 1987, the store's former space was divided among smaller retailers.

Lord & Taylor was proposed in 1997 as a fourth anchor store at the southeastern end of the mall. However, Hudson's attempted to sue the mall, claiming veto power over the addition of new anchor stores, and the Lord & Taylor was never built. A food court (Cafes in the woods) was built next to JCPenney in 1999 as well as a play area in the Sears wing. Also in 1999, RiverTown Crossings opened in Grandville, on the other side of the city. This was the first serious form of retail competition for Woodland Mall, as prior to the opening of RiverTown Crossings, Woodland was the only super-regional mall in Metro Grand Rapids. In the late 1990s Woodland Mall experienced many other renovations including new flooring and curves to the ceiling throughout the mall, new lighting and décor as well as updated entrances to look more modern.

Hudson's was converted to Marshall Field's in 2001 in a nameplate consolidation by parent Target Corporation (formerly known as Dayton-Hudson), and then to Macy's in 2006 as the result of an acquisition. A 14-screen movie theater (then owned by Cinemark) and a Red Robin and On the Border restaurant were added to the southeastern portion of the mall in 2006, the same year in which Pennsylvania Real Estate Investment Trust acquired the mall from Taubman. Celebration Cinema purchased the movie theater complex (as well as a former Cinemark at RiverTown Crossings) a year later.

Barnes & Noble, in October 2008, announced that it would be relocating from a nearby store to a new location at the mall.  On Wednesday, October 21, 2009, the two-story bookstore opened to the public.

In 2013 H&M announced that it would be opening its first location in Michigan outside of Metro Detroit which opened in October 2013.

On January 4, 2017, it was announced that Sears would be closing on March 26, 2017. Later it was changed to April 2, 2017. The Sears anchor building was demolished one year later, in March 2018 for a major expansion, including the extension of the Sears wing to feature 10-15 new shops, a Von Maur to be the new anchor at the end of the wing, another additional anchor store on the northwestern portion of the wing, new detached restaurants behind Celebration Cinema, 2 new outpracel stores where the Sears auto center was, all parking lots replaced in the mall, all of the mall and existing anchor exteriors to be updated as well as more improvements throughout the mall with a final completion in Fall 2019. The only stores officially confirmed were the Von Maur and the existing Apple Store to be moving into a new space next store where Justice and Claire's were, it is now double the size. Von Maur opened on October 12, 2019.

On May 17, 2019, REI opened in the parking lot.

In May 2020, Celebration Cinemas announced that their theater at Woodland would permanently close.

In July 2021, Phoenix Theaters had announced that they would be opening a theater at Woodland Mall, replacing Celebration Cinema.

References

External links
Woodland mall website

Economy of Grand Rapids, Michigan
Buildings and structures in Grand Rapids, Michigan
Shopping malls in Michigan
Shopping malls established in 1968
Tourist attractions in Grand Rapids, Michigan
Pennsylvania Real Estate Investment Trust